The flag of Charlotte is the official municipal flag of Charlotte, North Carolina. The official flag was adopted in 1929 and consists of a white saltire on a blue field, with the city seal in the center. A secondary flag, with a green field and a white crown in the center, was introduced in 1985 and is used at city government buildings. The latter flag is commonly able to be seen in public at certain spots around Charlotte, whereas the former one is not common, although it is present in certain spots. Charlotte is one of the few places to have two official flags with equal status.

Design and symbolism

Official flag 

Blue and white are the official colors of Charlotte, as reflected in the color choice for the field and saltire. The seal depicts a tree in the center, symbolizing growth. The rays radiating from the tree affirm this, representing hope for a bright future. Hanging off the tree is a hornet's nest, a Revolutionary War-era symbol. The symbol was explained in a city pamphlet, which reads:

More revolution symbolism can be found within the seal, with a Liberty Cap present, hanging on the tree. Beneath the tree are two hands clasped. Furthering the revolution symbolism is the date "1775" below the hands, the year the Mecklenburg Declaration of Independence was supposedly adopted, one year before the Continental Congress adopted their declaration. This revolution symbolism is to convey the idea of freedom for Charlotte's citizens. Surrounding the seal is the text "CITY OF CHARLOTTE MECKLENBURG COUNTY" on the top portion, and "NORTH CAROLINA" on the bottom portion. Separating the two portions are two blue five-pointed stars.

Government flag 
The green field is used to convey ideals the city focuses on. As a city communications representative put it:

Green has become somewhat of a de facto official color of the city. The city website uses many variants of green, e-mail signatures of city employees are green, city signs often use green, the University of North Carolina at Charlotte's official color is green and the city's streetcars are painted green. The crown, which occupies about three-fifths of the flag, is an homage to the "Queen City" nickname that Charlotte has. It gained the nickname from the city's namesake, Queen Charlotte, consort of King George III. The crown also represents the unity that all city agencies have as they cooperate for the good of citizens. The crown is the official logo for the city.

History
The official flag was adopted by the city council on May 6, 1929. The designer of the flag is unknown. The governmental flag was adopted 
in 1985. The designer for this flag is also unknown. The crown symbol is an officially registered trademark of the city. Only government entities or city-owned properties can fly the alternative flag. The official flag ranked 66th in a 2004 North American Vexillological Association survey of 150 American city flags. The flag ranked second out of three North Carolina city flags.

References

Flag
Flags of cities in North Carolina
1929 establishments in North Carolina
Flags introduced in 1929